Susan Catharine Eaton (July 9, 1957 – December 30, 2003) was an American political scientist and workers' rights activist. Eaton was an assistant professor of public policy at Harvard Kennedy School, who became a nursing home researcher at Harvard and workers' activist. She wrote about health care management, women's role in union leadership and work-family issues and gender equity in the workplace.

Early life and education 
Eaton was born in Washington, D.C. and raised in Alexandria, Virginia. Eaton attended T. C. Williams High School where she graduated in 1975 as the valedictorian. She earned a bachelor's degree in social studies from Harvard-Radcliffe College in 1979 magna cum laude and a member of Phi Beta Kappa. During her undergraduate years, she started Seventh Sister, a feminist alternative to The Harvard Crimson. She was involved with protesting investments by Harvard University in South Africa. She earned a master's degree in public administration at the John F. Kennedy School of Government in 1993. She was a Harmon Fellow. She completed a doctor of philosophy in industrial relations and organization studies at MIT Sloan School of Management. Her mentors were Thomas Anton Kochan and Lotte Bailyn. Her dissertation in 2000 was titled Work-family integration in biotechnology: implications for firms and employees.

Career 
Eaton worked for twelve years for the Service Employees International Union where she was an international representative, organizer, negotiator, researcher, and senior manager. She later worked as an assistant professor of public policy at John F. Kennedy School of Government. She was a workers' rights activist.

Personal life 
Eaton was married to Marshall Ganz. She died of acute myelogenous leukemia in Boston at age 46. She resided in Cambridge, Massachusetts.

Selected works

Journal articles 
Eaton, Susan C.. “Union Leadership Development in the 1990s and Beyond: A Report with Recommendations.” Discussion Paper, 92-05, Belfer Center for Science and International Affairs, Harvard Kennedy School, May 31, 1992.https://www.belfercenter.org/sites/default/files/files/publication/disc_paper_92_05.pdf

References

1957 births
2003 deaths
Deaths from acute myeloid leukemia
20th-century American educators
American women political scientists
American political scientists
Harvard Kennedy School faculty
Deaths from cancer in Massachusetts
MIT Sloan School of Management alumni
Harvard Kennedy School alumni
Radcliffe College alumni
Service Employees International Union people
Academics from Washington, D.C.
Educators from Washington, D.C.
Academics from Virginia
Educators from Virginia
20th-century American women educators
People from Alexandria, Virginia
Workers' rights activists
T. C. Williams High School alumni
21st-century American women
20th-century political scientists